Leslie Allen Williams (born July 4, 1953) is an American serial killer, rapist, and necrophile who is serving a life sentence without the possibility of parole in Michigan for the murders and rapes of four teenage girls in Oakland and Genesee counties from 1991 to 1992. His case became controversial in that he was on parole at the time of the killings, bringing up flaws in the Michigan parole system.

Early life 
Leslie Allen Williams was born on the 4th of July 1953 in Detroit, Michigan. His mom neglected him from a young age, so he was sent to and raised by his grandparents. His first run in of the law was when he was 17 in 1970, when he was arrested for breaking into a home in his neighborhood. He served only a year before getting out and continuing his criminal path. Over the next 12 years, Williams was repeatedly arrested for crimes that increased in severity. In September 1983, he was arrested for sexually assaulting a woman in her home, for which he was sentenced to 20 years in prison.

Murders  
In 1990, Williams, who had served 8 years in prison since his arrest for the rape, was granted parole. 9 months later, he killed his first victim. On September 14, 1991, Williams attacked 18-year-old Kami Villanueva in her home in Oakland county. He raped, then killed her, then buried her body in a shallow grave that Williams had dug up. 

Then, on September 29, 1991, Williams attacked sisters Melissa Urbin, who was 14, and Michelle Urbin, who was 16. The two were walking out at night when Williams attacked. He raped and killed the two, then put their bodies in his car. He drove to a secluded area and dug up two shallow graves, but before burying them, Williams said he had sex with their bodies. Five months later, on January 4, 1992, he raped and killed 15-year-old Cynthia Marie Jones. Just like all the victims before, Williams buried her in a shallow grave.

Arrest 
On May 24, 1992, Williams attempted to rape a woman after snatching her into his car at a cemetery. Witnesses to this called the police. Williams was arrested and taken into custody, later confessing to the four murders. Over the next three weeks, Williams showed police where he had buried his victims. The case eventually made headlines and questions were raised about the Michigan parole system. The family of Melissa and Michelle Urbin blamed the parole board for their daughter's deaths.

Conviction 
In 1992, Williams was sentenced to life imprisonment for the four murders and the attempted rape. As of September 2021, Leslie Allen Williams is still alive, serving his sentence at the Carson City Correctional Facility. He is currently 69-years-old.

See also 
 List of homicides in Michigan
 List of serial killers in the United States

References 

1953 births
20th-century American criminals
American male criminals
American murderers of children
American people convicted of murder
American prisoners sentenced to life imprisonment
American rapists
American serial killers
Criminals from Michigan
Living people
Male serial killers
Military personnel from North Carolina
Necrophiles
People convicted of murder by Michigan
People from Detroit
Prisoners sentenced to life imprisonment by Michigan
Violence against women in the United States